Robert Angelo (born 31 July 1970) is a Filipino former professional tennis player.

Angelo was a member of the Philippines Davis Cup team during the 1990s, appearing in a total of 10 ties. Between 1993 and 1998 he played in nine singles and eight doubles rubbers for the Philippines. He won two of his singles rubbers, against Japan's Ryuso Tsujino in 1995 and Suwandi of Indonesia in 1997.

A five-time Southeast Asian Games medalist, Angelo's tally includes a gold medal in the team event at Singapore in 1993. He also represented the Philippines in the Asian Games.

References

External links
 
 
 

1970 births
Living people
Filipino male tennis players
Tennis players at the 1994 Asian Games
Asian Games competitors for the Philippines
Southeast Asian Games gold medalists for the Philippines
Southeast Asian Games competitors for the Philippines
Southeast Asian Games silver medalists for the Philippines
Southeast Asian Games bronze medalists for the Philippines
Competitors at the 1993 Southeast Asian Games
Competitors at the 1995 Southeast Asian Games
Competitors at the 1997 Southeast Asian Games